Taluri-ye Sofla (also Romanized as Talūrī-ye Soflá and Telorī-ye Soflá; also known as Talūrī and Telorī) is a village in Koregah-e Gharbi Rural District, in the Central District of Khorramabad County, Lorestan Province, Iran. At the 2006 census, its population was 1,964, in 389 families.

References 

Towns and villages in Khorramabad County